Urbanization in India began to accelerate after independence, due to the country's adoption of a mixed economy, which gave rise to the development of the private sector. The population residing in urban areas in India, according to the 1901 census, was 11.4%, increasing to 28.53% by the 2001 census, and is now currently 34% in 2017 according to The World Bank. According to a survey by UN, in 2030 40.76% of country's population is expected to reside in urban areas. As per World Bank, India, along with China, Indonesia, Nigeria, and the United States, will lead the world's urban population surge by 2050.

Mumbai saw large-scale rural-urban migration in the 20th century.[see main] Mumbai, in 2018, accommodates 22.1 million people, and is the second-largest metropolis by population in India. Delhi has 28 million inhabitants and witnessed the fastest rate of urbanization in the world, with a 4.1% rise in population as per the 2011 census.

History

Post-independence, India faced high rates of poverty, unemployment, and a stagnant economy. Post independence india focused on the domain of science and technology. The mixed economy system was adopted, resulting in the growth of the Public sector in India crippling down the development of Indian economy leading to what is popularly known as Hindu rate of growth. The South Asian region though predominantly rural (accounted for 69.9% rural population as of 2010), has recorded much higher annual growth of urban population. India, the leading country in South Asia has shown an unprecedented increase in the urban population in the last few decades and its urban population has increased about 14 fold from 1901 to 2011. This growth is mainly uneven but not skewed and not concentrated to a single city of the country. India shares most characteristic features of urbanization in the developing countries where the rate of urbanization is faster than the developed countries. For instance, in 1971 there were only about 150 cities whose population was more than one lakh, now this figure has reached to 500. The urban population of India has increased from 25.85 million in 1901 to 377.11 million in 2011.

Modern India

Since 1941, India has witnessed the rapid growth of its four largest metropolitan cities: Kolkata, Delhi, Mumbai, and Chennai. The nation's economy has undergone industrial revolution, thus increasing the standard of living of people living in urban areas. The growth of the public sector resulted in development of public transport, roads, water supply, electricity, and other infrastructure of urban areas.

As the percentage contribution of the secondary sector to India's GDP has increased, the percentage contribution from the agricultural sector has declined. It is estimated that the agricultural sector provides employment to 50% of the country's workforce, but accounts for only 18% of the GDP. Many farmers in different states of India are leaving farming, primarily because of high input cost and low income from agriculture. Also, the prolonged use of fertilizers, chemicals, and hybrid seeds has led to a decline in land fertility. Struggling to make a living, many farmers have committed suicide.

Maharashtra was the most urbanized major state in India till 1991, stood behind Tamil Nadu in 2001 and third after it in 2011, with Kerala being second, with the urban-total state population ratio. However, Maharashtra's urban population of 41 million, far exceeds that of Tamil Nadu which is at 27 million, as per the 2001 census. The spatial distribution of large cities in India is uneven as out of 100 most populous cities in the country more than 50 are confined to only 5 states namely, Uttar Pradesh, Maharashtra, Tamil Nadu, Kerala and Andhra Pradesh.

Causes of urbanization in India

The main causes of urbanization in India are:
 Expansion in government services, as a result of the Second World War
 Migration of people during the partition of India
 Industrial development in urban areas
 India's eleventh Five-Year Plan, which targeted urbanization as a means to accelerate economic development
 Economic opportunities, including employment
 Better opportunities for education
 Infrastructure facilities in urban areas
 Growth of the private sector after 1990
 Land fragmentation: some villages have been erased due to construction of roads, highways, dams, and other infrastructure
 Non-profitability of farming

Consequences of urbanization in India

Rapid rise in urban population, in India, is leading to many problems like increasing slums, decrease in standard of living in urban areas, also causing environmental damage.

The Industrial Revolution of the 18th century caused countries like the United States and the United Kingdom to become superpowers, but conditions elsewhere are worsening. India's urban growth rate is 2.07%; seemingly insignificant compared to Rwanda, with 7.6%. India has around 300 million people living in metropolitan areas. This has greatly increased housing issues: with overcrowded cities, many people are forced to live in unsafe conditions, such as illegal buildings. Water lines, roads and electricity are lacking in quality, resulting in a decline in living standards. It is also contributing to the issues presented by pollution.

Urbanization also results in a disparity in the market, owing to the large demands of the growing population and the primary sector struggling to cope.

It could be argued that urbanization impacts the migrants themselves on multiple levels. Networks of friends and family become support systems during the initial transformation phase and the struggle to find work in a fast-paced environment. Their struggles may take months, or even years, to adjust to the new surrounds in order to find a stable job. Migrants are responsible for supporting both themselves in the city and the family left at home.

Some of the positive effects resulting from rural to urban migration occur in the agrarian communities from which migrants came. Family members left at home, usually the elderly and young, are eased out of financial pressures as their relatives work to provide higher standards of living for their dependants. Their quality of life is often additionally improved by the provisions that the migrant sends back.

On the other hand, rural to urban migration poses a big challenge for developing cities due to migrant populations flocking in. How will cities support it in terms of resources, land and space?

Cities offer solutions in terms of high rise buildings (affordable housing), metros (affordable transport), affordable schooling, established local clinics, water ATMs, and many new initiatives. However, the problems include:

1. National Institution for Transforming India [NITI Ayog], has released report ‘Composite Water Management Index’ in June 2018 and stated that 21 cities (including Delhi, Mumbai, and Chennai) in India would run out of groundwater by 2020.

2. The latest database of Numbeo lists three Indian cities among the top 10 cities of the world for having worst traffic conditions. These cities include Mumbai, Pune and Kolkata.

3. Population growth and rapid urbanization are combining to create huge challenges for Indian cities. According to McKinsey, the country's cities are expected to grow from 340 million people in 2008 to a whopping 590 million in 2030 and this growth will be very rapid. Meeting demand for urban services in these cities will require US$1.1 trillion in capital investment over the next 20 years. Without the right design and planning, this massive urban growth could exacerbate existing problems of congestion, pollution, and traffic safety.

4. Delhi is now considered the most polluted city in the world, according to the Brookings Institution, while at least two-and-a-half million premature deaths are blamed on poor air quality across the country as a whole.

5. The Economic Survey Report of India 2017-18 estimated that percentage of agricultural workers of total work force would drop to 25.7 per cent by 2050 from 58.2 per cent in 2001. What is the cause of this decline? People migrating to cities and adding to the unemployment in cities. It is interesting to know that because of migration from rural pockets to urban (cities), unemployment in cities is increasing and in rural pockets it's decreasing.  As per the Centre for Monitoring Indian Economy (CMIE) overall unemployment rate of India as on 18 October 2018 is 6.9% , whereas for urban India its 7.5% and for rural India its 6.6%.

Urban unemployment

The National Sample Survey Organisation reported the following urban unemployment rates for the period July 2011–June 2012:

References

Bibliography

External links

 URBANET Urbanisation in India | Infographics

Urbanization in India
Society of India
Economy of India
Geography of India